P'ukru (Quechua for hole, pit, gap in a surface, hispanicized spelling Pucro, erroneously also spelled Pusro) is a mountain in the Andes of Peru, about  high. It is located in the Lima Region, Cajatambo Province, Gorgor District, and in the Oyón Province, Oyón District.

References

Mountains of Peru
Mountains of Lima Region